ShowBT Philippines is an entertainment, creative content and event promotion group based in the Philippines. The company was founded on 2012 by Jung Seong-han (정성한), a South Korean comedian and a former member of the popular comedic team Cult Triple in 2012 to commercially develop world class individuals and entertainment properties with an established music or fashion pedigree. The company provides artist services that include management, television, music, public events production, social media engagement, Public Relations, and entertainment marketing and has offices in South Korea, the Philippines, Thailand, Vietnam and UAE.

The company produced Aja Aja Tayo!, the first Filipino-Korean reality variety show in the Philippine television broadcast on TV5. The company also manages the global pop group SB19, the first Pinoy pop group and Southeast Asian act to make it to the final list of Billboard Music Awards for Top Social Artist and nominated to the MTV Europe Music Awards. and 4th Impact, a Filipino girl group who competed in the twelfth season of the British singing contest The X Factor, where they finished in fifth place. ShowBT also manages soloist rapper Pablo and RnB singer Felip.

Starting point 
On 2005, ShowBT has been operating a department specializing in education development and presenting participatory educational contents that combine various genres including literature and art.

Jung's long-time goal has been the "localization" of K-pop. It is the reason ShowBT introduce a new paradigm to the Southeast Asian cultural market through the production and distribution of cultural contents based on Hallyu (Korean wave).

In July 2018,  ShowBT receive permission to air Aja Aja Tayo! show on TV5 for 13 consecutive weeks. The first Korean show to receive permission on the free-to-air television in the Philippines.

In May 2018, ShowBT oversaw the 2018 Miss Korea Pageant regional preliminaries.

On November 10, 2021, ShowBT Entertainment publicly launched SB19's sister group KAIA.

Current artists

Philippines

Recording artists 

Groups
SB19
4th Impact
KAIA

Duo
Z2Z

Soloists
Ken
Pablo
Josh Cullen
Mona Gonzales
JinHo Bae

References 

 
Companies based in Seoul
Companies based in Makati
Entertainment companies established in 2003
Music production companies
South Korean brands
South Korean record labels
Talent agencies of the Philippines
Talent agencies of South Korea
Philippine companies established in 2012
Entertainment companies of the Philippines